SEAL Team can refer to:
A component of the United States Navy SEALs, a special operations force (e.g.: Team 1, Team 2, etc.)
SEAL Team Six, a Tier One unit
A component of Naval Special Warfare Command (Thailand)
SEAL Team (TV series), an American television series on CBS
SEAL Team (video game), an Electronic Arts video game for MS-DOS based on US Navy SEALs
Seal Team (film), a 2021 animated film from Netflix